USS Iuka may refer to the following ships operated by the United States:

 , a steamer acquired by the Union Navy during the American Civil War. She served from 1864 to 1865.
 , a  serving from 1942 to 1947
 , a  serving from 1920 to 1946
 , a  large district harbor tug

United States Navy ship names